Kaimana Regency is a regency in the south of West Papua province of Indonesia. It covers an area of 18,500 sq. km, and had a population of 46,249 at the 2010 Census and 62,256 at the 2020 Census. The administrative centre is the town of Kaimana. The Mairasi languages are spoken in the regency, among other languages.

Administrative Districts
The regency comprises seven districts (kecamatan), tabulated below with their populations at the 2010 Census and the 2020 Census. The table also includes the locations of the district administrative centres, the number of administrative villages (desa and kelurahan) in each district and its post code.

Offshore Islands
Kaimana Regency contains over 500 separate offshore islands, spread over the five districts with coastlines. Kaimana District includes at least 280 islands, of which the largest are Pulau Namatota, Pulau Aiduma and Pulau Dramai. There are at least 62 islands in Teluk Etna District, of which the largest is Pulau Kayumerah. Teluk Arguni Bawah District includes 31 islands. There are 14 islands in Buruway District, of which the largest are Pulau Adi (the regency's largest offshore island, including the village of Manggawitu) and Pulau Kelimala. Kambrau District includes 4 islands.

Demographics

Ethnic Groups  
The customs in Kaimana Regency, which because of its strategic location as a stopover (transit), have been influenced by culture from outside (social interaction) so that the indigenous values of this area have been acculturated by the surrounding cultural values. People who live in inland mountainous areas have not been much influenced by outside interactions, while residents of coastal areas have had a lot of this influence through marriage, music/dance and clothing. Most of the inhabitants of Kaimana Kota District are in the villages. The inhabitants of Kaimana District, who are local tribes, are the largest population, followed by non-indigenous people (who come from outside areas) who are scattered in several villages in the Kaimana Kota kelurahan, such as Seram and Kaki Air. The non-indigenous population in these two villages is a spontaneous migration of the population from Maluku and South Sulawesi and the island of Java, who live in a pattern of clustered settlements in separate pockets of settlement. Indigenous people are found in the villages inside and outside the urban kaimana kota. The indigenous tribes include the Irarutu, Mairasi, Kambrau and Kowiai. The distribution of the Irarutu tribe is in the southern area of the Kaimana city and the tribe originates from the Teluk Arguni District. The Mairasi tribe originates from the interior of the eastern part of Kaimana and spread across the North East coast of Kaimana District. The Kambrau tribe originates from the Teluk Kambrau District, Kaimana District and the Arguni Bay area and is spread across the southern and northern coasts of the Kaimana Kota kelurahan. The Koiwai tribe originates from the western area of Buruway District and the northern area of the Kaimana District. This tribe mostly inhabits archipelagic areas.

Religion  
The composition of the religious adherents in Kaimana Regency is quite diverse, namely Protestantism, Islam, Catholicism, Hinduism and Buddhism. The condition of harmony and tolerance between religious communities is running quite well. Based on data released by the Kaimana Regency Government in 2021, as of January 1, 2021, the majority of the population is Islam, which is 50.63% (generally consists of local coastal Papuans combined with migrants from outside Papua). Religious followers Christianity are also quite large, namely 49.32% where Protestants are 39.98% and Catholic 9.34% (basically Papuans). While adherents of religion Hindu 0.06%.

Lengguru area
Lengguru is well-preserved without land opened for plantation, logging or mining. This is in stark contrast to the other parts of Indonesia (especially the Indonesian Papua area which is not 100 percent preserved).

In 2014 researchers revealed the level of biodiversity in the Lengguru area covering its coastal region and karsts. The expedition covered a range from 100 meters below sea level underwater up to 1,000 meters above sea level. Many species of flora and fauna were discovered, of which some are new species.

References

External links
Statistics publications from Statistics Indonesia (BPS)

Regencies of West Papua (province)